Edwin Percival Ansley (born March 30, 1865 in Augusta, Georgia – died July 2, 1923 in Atlanta) was a real estate developer in Atlanta.

Career
In 1902, Ansley developed Atlanta's first suburb designed specifically for automobiles, Ansley Park, and also built the Hotel Ansley in the Fairlie-Poplar district of Downtown Atlanta. In 1898, he secured the railway right of way from Howell Station to Mitchell Street in Downtown Atlanta, a line which the Atlanta, Birmingham and Atlantic Railway would later take over.

In 1914 Ansley developed Oglethorpe Park subdivision in today's Brookhaven, between the Capital City Club (of which Ansley was a member) and Oglethorpe University.

Death

Ansley was buried in Oakland Cemetery in Atlanta.

References

External links

Real estate and property developers
Businesspeople from Atlanta
American railway entrepreneurs
1865 births
1923 deaths